Kenneth Dale Eoff (October 3, 1951 – July 15, 2020), known professionally as Kenny Dale, was an American country music artist.

He was born in Artesia, New Mexico, United States, and musically active in the 1970s, he recorded two albums for Capitol Records and charted several country hits, including "Bluest Heartache of the Year". His biggest hit was a cover version of Gene Pitney's "Only Love Can Break a Heart", which peaked at No. 7. Dale retired from the country music business in the early 1980s, and took up residence in Nashville, Tennessee. He had later worked as a school bus driver in San Antonio, Texas.

Dale died from COVID-19 in San Antonio, Texas, on July 15, 2020. He had entered the hospital on July 12, due to breathing complications.

Discography

Albums
All albums released on Capitol Records.

Singles

References

1951 births
2020 deaths
American country singer-songwriters
Capitol Records artists
Singers from New Mexico
People from Artesia, New Mexico
Deaths from the COVID-19 pandemic in Texas